Lia Lapithi (born  Lia Lapithi, 1963) is a Greek Cypriot artist specialising in multimedia and visual art. She currently resides in Nicosia.

Early life and education

Lia Lapithi was born in Nicosia, Cyprus, in 1963. She studied Art and Environmental Design at the University of California Santa Cruz, followed by a Master of Philosophy at Lancaster University. After her studies she returned to Cyprus in 1984. She continued her studies in 1989, obtaining a Master's degree in Architecture from the Kent Institute of Art and Design in 1991, followed by a Masters in Art Education from the University of Wales in 1994.

Career
Her work focused initially on landscape and still-life painting through the use of technology, followed by medical art, evolving over time to also address environmental and political issues, including collective memory, nationalist historiography and the Cyprus Dispute. She has been credited for creating the first Cypriot feminist art group in 2006, called "Washing-Up Ladies". The group has addressed topics ranging from the relationship of women to contemporary Cypriot politics, to women's gender roles in Cypriot society. Lapithi's work has also been hosted by various museums and galleries, while numerous of her pieces form part of permanent museum collections. During her career she has exhibited her work in various locations, including in Athens, Alexandria, Paris, Vienna and Constantinople.

Permanent museum collections
Works of Lia Lapithi held in permanent museum collections include:
“Still-life III”, “Mechanical Billboard I”, “Blue Legs”, “Leg Operation video”, “Circulation Bed”, “Test Tube Bed”, “Olive-bread” “Defining Silence”, “Peace-Dinner” and "82,5km", held by the Cypriot State Collection of Contemporary Art in Nicosia, Cyprus.
"Marinated Crushed Olives" (video), held by Centre Pompidou in Paris, France.
"Marinated Crushed Olives" (video), held by the Museum of European and Mediterranean Civilisations in Marseille, France.
"Requiem pour un oiseau rebelle" (installation), held by the Musées de la ville de Marseille in France.
"Defining Silence", held by the BPS22 Musee d’Art de la Provence de Hainut-Charlerois in Belgium.

Selected publications

2011 Suspended Spaces #1 Famagusta - Blackjack editions (Montreuil, France) ISBN 978-2-918063-10-0.
2012 Suspended Spaces #2 Blackjack editions (Paris) ISBN 978-2-918063-25-4.
2012 Contre Nature, Musee Departemental de l’Oise-Beauvais, ISBN 978-2-901290-25-4.
2014 Ethiques du gout, Editions L’ Harmattan, ISBN 978-2-343-03903-9.
2014 Suspended Spaces #3, Les Editions de l’ Ecole des Beaux Arts.

See also
Visual Arts
Art film

References

External links
 Official Website

1963 births
Living people
20th-century women artists
21st-century women artists
Women digital artists
20th-century Cypriot women
21st-century Cypriot women
Greek Cypriot artists
Cypriot women artists
Cypriot women film directors